Kenneth Stenild Nielsen (born September 11, 1987) is a Danish retired professional footballer.

Career
He was regarded as one of the most talented goalkeepers in Denmark, having played 33 matches for various Danish youth national teams. At the age of 16 and 17 he attended trials at Premier League clubs Arsenal and Manchester United, but stated his willingness to remain at AaB.

Kenneth Stenild made his senior debut for AaB, when he played two games in the UEFA Intertoto Cup 2007 in July 2007.

Later career
After retiring from football at the end of 2019, Stenild became an assistant coach at Denmark Series club Vejgaard Boldspilklub.

References

External links
Fram Larvik profile
Danish national team profile
Official Danish Superliga stats

1987 births
Living people
Danish men's footballers
Association football goalkeepers
AaB Fodbold players
Vendsyssel FF players
AC Horsens players
SønderjyskE Fodbold players
SK Vard Haugesund players
Danish Superliga players
Expatriate footballers in Norway